Piseinotecus is a genus of sea slugs, aeolid nudibranchs, marine gastropod mollusks in the family Piseinotecidae.

Etymology 
The name Piseinotecus comes from the Portuguese sentence "pisei no Teco" (I stepped onto Teco). Teco was the name of a dog of the zoologists Ernst Marcus and Eveline Du Bois-Reymond Marcus. While they were looking for a name for the genus, their friend, the zoologist Diva Diniz Corrêa, was visiting them and stated the sentence while coming down the stairs to announce that she had accidentally stepped onto their dog.

Species
Species in the genus Piseinotecus include:
 Piseinotecus divae Er. Marcus, 1955
 Piseinotecus gonja Edmunds, 1970
 Piseinotecus kima Edmunds, 1970
 Piseinotecus minipapilla Edmunds, 2015 
 Piseinotecus soussi Tamsouri, Carmona, Moukrim & Cervera, 2014
 Piseinotecus sphaeriferus (Schmekel, 1965)

Species brought into synonymy
 Piseinotecus evelinae Schmekel, 1980: synonym of Piseinotecus gabinierei (Vicente, 1975)
 Piseinotecus gabinierei (Vicente, 1975): synonym of Paraflabellina gabinierei
 Piseinotecus gaditanus Cervera, García-Gómez & García, 1987: synonym of Calmella gaditana

References

Piseinotecidae
Taxa named by Ernst Marcus (zoologist)